Maran is a rabbinic title.

Maran may also refer to:

Maran (actor) (1972–2021), an Indian Tamil film actor
Maran (surname)
Maran, Myanmar, a village in Kachin State
Maran, Iran (disambiguation), places in Iran
Maran, Pahang, Malaysia
Maran languages of Australia
the Syriac-Christian title for Jesus; see Mar

See also
 Marans (disambiguation)
 Maaran (disambiguation)